A message picture (or message movie) is a motion picture that, in addition to or instead of being for entertainment, intends to communicate a certain message or ideal about society.

Characteristics
Message pictures usually present the message they want to deliver in the form of a morality play, and are usually serious (often somber) works. However, not all message pictures are entirely serious, and there are also films spoofing the genre (Sullivan's Travels, for example).

History
Dore Schary was famous for his message pictures at Metro-Goldwyn-Mayer during the late 1940s and early to mid-1950s. Among these were Tea and Sympathy, Bad Day at Black Rock, and Blackboard Jungle. Other famous message pictures by other parties include Guess Who's Coming to Dinner and In the Heat of the Night (the former directed by Stanley Kramer, who was also well known for numerous message films).

In Indian cinema, B.R. Chopra was known for message pictures. Examples include Kanoon (against capital punishment), Naya Daur (importance of labour), Waqt (importance of time and destiny), Nikaah (against triple talaq (divorce) among Muslims), etc.

Examples

Pre-1970
The Grapes of Wrath (1940)
It's a Wonderful Life (1946)
On the Waterfront (1954)
Salt of the Earth (1954)
Paths of Glory (1957)

I Want to Live! (1958)
On the Beach (1959)
Judgment at Nuremberg (1961)
The Connection (1961)
The Manchurian Candidate (1962)
To Kill a Mockingbird (1962)

The Intruder (1962)
A Child Is Waiting (1963)
Fail Safe (1964)
Seconds (1966)

Post-1970
Billy Jack (1971)
The Deer Hunter (1978)
Gandhi (1982)
White Dog (1982)
The Color Purple (1985)
Stand and Deliver (1988)
Born on the Fourth of July (1989)
Do the Right Thing (1989)
Philadelphia (1993)
Schindler's List (1993)
Amistad (1997)
American History X (1998)
American Beauty (1999)
The Cider House Rules (1999)
Music of the Heart (1999)
Erin Brockovich (2000)
Pay It Forward (2000)
Remember the Titans (2000)
I Am Sam (2001)
House of Sand and Fog (2003)
The Sea Inside (2004)
Woman Thou Art Loosed (2004)
American Gun (2005)
Akeelah and the Bee (2006)
Babel (2006)
Crash (2005)
Blood Diamond (2006)
Coach Carter (2006)
Wall-E (2008)
Avatar (2009)
Courageous (2011)
Where to Invade Next (2015)
Don't Look Up (2021)
Sources:

Notable directors
Spike Lee
Stanley Kramer
Tom Laughlin
Elia Kazan
Oliver Stone
Abel Gance
Norman Jewison
Frank Capra
Richard Attenborough
Edward Dmytryk

See also
Oscar bait
Social issues
Social problem film
Very Special Episode
Virtue signaling
After-school special
Television film
Christian film
Melodrama
Social thriller
Public service announcement
New Hollywood
Indiewood

References

Film genres
Film and video terminology
Films about social issues
1940s in film
1950s in film
1960s in film
1970s in film
1980s in film
1990s in film
2000s in film
2010s in film